The 1925 Oregon Agricultural Aggies football team was an American football team that represented Oregon Agricultural College (now known as Oregon State University) in the Pacific Coast Conference (PCC) during the 1925 PCC football season.  In its second season under head coach Paul J. Schissler, the team compiled a 7–2 record (3–2 against PCC opponents), finished in a tie for third place in the PCC, and outscored opponents by a total of 268 to 81. Under coach Schissler, from 1925 to 1932, no team captains were elected.  The team played its home games at Bell Field in Corvallis, Oregon.

Schedule

References

Oregon Agricultural
Oregon State Beavers football seasons
Oregon Agricultural Aggies football